Megginson is a surname. Notable people with the name include:

David Megginson (born 1964), Canadian computer consultant
Leon C. Megginson (born 1921), American business academic
Mitchel Megginson (born 1992), Scottish footballer
Robert Megginson (born 1948), American mathematician

See also
Ernest Megginson House, historic home in Alabama